WWBA (820 kHz) is a commercial AM radio station that airs a talk/sports radio format. Licensed to Largo, Florida, it serves the Tampa Bay area. The station is currently owned by Genesis Communications of Tampa Bay, LLC, and operated by NIA Broadcasting under an LMA.  It was formerly known as "News Talk 820 WWBA".

WWBA is one of two 50,000-watt stations based in the Tampa Bay area with AM 1010 WHFS as the other. However, as AM 820 is a clear channel frequency reserved for WBAP in Fort Worth, Texas, WWBA reduces power to 1,000 watts at night to avoid interference and uses a directional antenna at all times. WWBA's transmitter is on 8th Avenue SE in Largo.

WWBA is also heard on two FM translator stations: 96.7 W244EG in Tampa and 98.3 W252DF in Largo.

History

The station went on the air as WSST on May 29, 1972, broadcasting at 800 kHz. It was a daytimer, powered at only 250 watts and required to be off the air at night, to protect clear-channel stations CKLW in Windsor, Ontario, Canada and XEROK-AM in Ciudad Juárez, Mexico. Its first format was Southern Gospel music. It later moved to AM 820, as it sought upgrading its daytime signal while providing local nighttime service.

Over the years, it has carried Christian radio, country music, talk radio, and sports radio, as well as a Spanish-language Contemporary Hits format, as "La Preciosa 820".

As a talk station, WWBA once aired more locally-produced programming, but later switched to syndicated conservative talk shows. It was affiliated with ABC News Radio. WWBA also aired a local midday show by Dan Maduri and had local sports hosts filling the morning hours. The station was also home to The Morning Magazine with Mark Larsen, which ended in December 2009. Another local talk show, Dan York's "The Tampa Bay Experience", was canceled in July 2009. In May 2019, afternoon host Chris Ingram was let go. In June 2019, the rest of the station's on-air announcers were let go.

On September 29, 2008, WWBA moved its talk programming from 1040 AM to 820 AM, after it was announced that the station's owners, Genesis Communications, would be purchasing 820 AM from Mega Communications. The owners transferred the WWBA call sign to 820 when the sale closed.

On February 13, 2017, WWBA became the new flagship station of the Bubba the Love Sponge Show after WBRN-FM dropped the show the previous month due to a format change. In February 2019, the show left WWBA and moved to 1040 WHBO. Also in February 2019, owner Genesis Communications turned over management of the station to NIA Broadcasting via an LMA.

In June 2019, 820 WWBA changed to automated 1970s-1990s classic country music. The station discontinued local programming.

On October 8, 2019, 820 WWBA switched back to a news talk format.

On May 26, 2020, WWBA changed their format from news/talk to talk/sports, branded as "The Big 8", with sports programming from CBS Sports Radio.

References

External links

Station history

WBA
Radio stations established in 1972
1972 establishments in Florida
Talk radio stations in the United States
Sports radio stations in the United States